Härtlingen is an Ortsgemeinde – a community belonging to a Verbandsgemeinde – in the Westerwaldkreis in Rhineland-Palatinate, Germany.

Geography

Location
Härtlingen lies 5 km southwest of Westerburg in the Elbbach Valley. Since 1972 it has belonged to what was then the newly founded Verbandsgemeinde of Westerburg, a kind of collective municipality.

Constituent communities
Härtlingen  has an outlying centre called Unterhärtlingen.

History
In 1292, Härtlingen had its first documentary mention as Hertlingen.

Politics

The municipal council is made up of 9 council members, including the extraofficial mayor (Bürgermeister), who were elected in a majority vote in a municipal election on 7 June 2009.

Economy and infrastructure

West of the community runs Bundesstraße 255, leading from Montabaur to Herborn. The nearest Autobahn interchange is Montabaur on the A 3 (Cologne–Frankfurt). The nearest InterCityExpress stop is the railway station at Montabaur on the Cologne-Frankfurt high-speed rail line.

References

External links
Härtlingen
 Härtlingen in the collective municipality’s Web pages 

Municipalities in Rhineland-Palatinate
Westerwaldkreis